Robert Archer may refer to:
Robert Archer (English politician) (fl. 1407–1411), MP for Winchester
Robert Archer (Australian politician), for Electoral district of Ringwood (Tasmania)

See also
Bob Archer (1899–1982), British footballer